The Rhythmic chart (concurrently referred to as Rhythmic Songs since June 2009) debuted in Billboard Magazine in the issue dated October 3, 1992, as the Top 40/Rhythm-Crossover chart. Weekly rankings are "compiled from a national sample of airplay" as measured by Nielsen BDS monitoring rhythmic radios stations in the United States continuously.

Below is the list of songs to reach number one on the Rhythmic chart during the 2010s.

Number-one rhythmic hits of the 2010s
Key
↓↑ – Song's run at number one was non-consecutive
 – Number-one rhythmic song of the year

See also
2010s in music
List of Billboard Hot 100 number-one singles of the 2010s
List of artists who reached number one on the U.S. Rhythmic chart

References 

United States Rhythmic
Lists of number-one songs in the United States
2010s in American music